Mallonia barbicornis is a species of beetle in the family Cerambycidae. It was described by Johan Christian Fabricius in 1798. It is known from Ghana, Benin, the Ivory Coast, and Guinea.

References

Pachystolini
Beetles described in 1798
Taxa named by Johan Christian Fabricius